Saul Levi Morteira or Mortera ( 1596  – 10 February 1660) was a Dutch rabbi of Portuguese descent.

Life
In a Spanish poem Daniel Levi de Barrios speaks of him as being a native of Germany ("de Alemania natural"). From the age of thirteen, Morteira accompanied Elijah Montalto to Paris and served as his secretary at the Louvre until 1616, when Montalto died and Morteira escorted the body of the physician from France to Amsterdam. The Sephardic Congregation Beth Jaacob (House of  Jacob) in Amsterdam elected him hakham in succession to Moses ben Aroyo.

Morteira was the founder of the congregational school Keter Torah, in the highest class of which he taught Talmud and Jewish philosophy. He had also to preach three times a month, and received an annual remuneration of 600 guilders and 100 baskets of turf. Among his most distinguished pupils were Baruch Spinoza, Moses Zacuto and Abraham Cohen Pimentel. Morteira and Isaac da Fonseca Aboab (Manasseh ben Israel was at that time in England) were the members of the mahamad, the political arm of the community, which pronounced on 27 July 1656 the decree of excommunication ("cherem") against Spinoza.

Works
Some of Morteira's pupils published Gibeat Shaul (Amsterdam, 1645), a collection of fifty sermons on the Pentateuch, selected from 500 derashot written by Morteira.

Morteira wrote in Spanish Tractado de la Verdad de la Ley (translated into Hebrew by Isaac Gomez de Gosa under the title Torat Moshch, in 66 chapters), apologetics of Judaism and attacks against Christianity. This work (excerpts from which are given in Jacques Basnage, Histoire de la Religion des Juifs) and other writings of Morteira, on immortality, revelation, etc., are still in manuscript.

Morteira's polemical sermons in Hebrew against the Catholic Church were published, but his Portuguese writings against Calvinism remained unpublished.

References

Bibliography
 Herman Prins Salomon: “O haham Saul Levi Mortera e a vaca vermelha” (Pará Adumá), pp. 83–104
 Its bibliography:
Auerbach, Berthold, Spinozas Werke, vol. i, pp. xxiv. et seq., Stuttgart, 1871;
Azulai, C.J.D., Shem ha-Gedolim, ii.17, Warsaw, 1876;
Isaac Benjacob, Oẓar ha-Sefarim, p. 93;
Freudenthal, Jacob, Die Lebensgeschichte Spinozas, pp. 4–11, 113–114, et passim, Leipzig, 1899;
—, Spinoza, Sein Leben, 1904, i;
Fürst, Julius, Bibliotheca Judaica ii.391;
Grätz, Heinrich, Geschichte der Juden ix.503; x.9-11, 169, 175, ib. 1868;
Kayserling, Meyer, Geschichte der Juden in Portugal, pp. 275, 310, ib. 1867 (available here);
Steinschneider, Moritz, Catalogus Librorum Hebræorum in Bibliotheca Bodleiana cols. 2508–2509;
Wolf, Johann Christoph, Bibliotheca Hebræa.

External links

1590s births
1660 deaths
17th-century Dutch rabbis
Dutch Sephardi Jews
17th-century Republic of Venice rabbis
Jewish apologists
Sephardi rabbis
People associated with Baruch Spinoza